= Indiana State College =

Indiana State College may refer to:

- Indiana University of Pennsylvania in Indiana, Pennsylvania; known as Indiana State College from 1959-1965
- Indiana State University in Terre Haute, Indiana; known as Indiana State College from 1961-1965

== See also ==
- Indiana University
